Wolfgang Ernst (born 1959) is a German media theorist. He is Professor for Media Theories at Humboldt University of Berlin and a major exponent of media archaeology as a method of scholarly inquiry.

Biography
Ernst studied history, archaeology and classics at the University of Cologne, University of London, and Ruhr University Bochum. He wrote his dissertation on the aesthetic history of collections and work as  an assistant at the Studienstiftung. He held positions in Leipzig, Kassel, Rome, Cologne, Weimar, Bochum, Paderborn and Berlin. Wolfgang Ernst collaborated with bootlab Berlin and developed alternative formats of theory with Till Nikolaus von Heiseler.

In 2001 he finished his habilitation about institutions of remembrance and memory in the 19th and 20th century. Since April 2003 he is a full professor at Humboldt University of Berlin. 2015-2017 Wolfgang Ernst has held the position as director of the Department for Musicology and Media Studies at Humboldt University of Berlin.

Ernst is internationally known as a theorist of archives and the media practice of archiving and as an exponent of media archaeology. His latest work focuses on media-time, time-critical media, and the "sonic" as a form that connects technical and musical practices. He is the founder of a unique operative collection of technical media at Humboldt University Berlin — the "media archaeological fund".

Selected writings in German
Das Rumoren der Archive. Ordnung aus Unordnung, Merve, Berlin 2002
Im Namen von Geschichte. Sammeln – Speichern – (Er-)Zählen (Habilitationsschrift HU Berlin), Wilhelm Fink, München 2003 
Das Gesetz des Gedächtnisses. Medien und Archive am Ende (des 20. Jahrhunderts), Kulturverlag Kadmos, Berlin 2007
Doppelband Gleichursprünglichkeit. Zeitwesen und Zeitgegebenheit technischer Medien und Chronopoetik. Zeitweisen und Zeitgaben technischer Medien, Kulturverlag Kadmos, Berlin, 2013
Signale aus der Vergangenheit. Eine kleine Geschichtskritik, Wilhelm Fink, Berlin 2013
Im Medium erklingt die Zeit. Technologische Tempor(e)alitäten und das Sonische als ihre privilegierte Erkenntnisform, Kulturverlag Kadmos, Berlin 2015

Selected writings in English
Digital Memory and the Archive., (edited and with an introduction by Jussi Parikka) University of Minnesota Press, Minneapolis, London 2013
Stirrings in the Archive. Order from Disorder, (translation of Das Rumoren der Archive) Rowman & Littlefield, Lanham, Boulder, New York, London 2015
Chronopoetics. The Temporal Being and Operativity of technological Media, (selection and translation of texts taken from Gleichursprünglichkeit. Zeitwesen und Zeitgegebenheit technischer Medien and Chronopoetik. Zeitweisen und Zeitgaben technischer Medien) Rowman & Littlefield, Lanham, Boulder, New York, London 2016
Sonic Time Machines. Explicit Sound, Sirenic Voices, and Implicit Sonicity, Amsterdam University Press, Amsterdam 2016
The Delayed Present: Media-Induced Tempor(e)alities & Techno-traumatic Irritations of the Contemporary, Sternberg Press, Berlin 2017

References

External links

Ernst's homepage at Humboldt University Berlin
unedited texts and scripts by Wolfgang Ernst in English

1959 births
Living people
Mass media theorists
Alumni of the University of London
Ruhr University Bochum alumni
University of Cologne alumni
Academic staff of the Humboldt University of Berlin